is a Japanese shōjo manga series written by Ayuko Hatta. It was adapted into a drama CD in 2013. In 2014, the May issue of Shueisha's Bessatsu Margaret magazine announced that an anime television had been green-lit. The anime aired from October 5 to December 21, 2014. Sentai Filmworks has licensed the series. The anime stares with Erika falling in love with her fake boyfriend, Black Prince Kyoya and must deal with him refusing to accept his feelings for her.

Plot

Erika Shinohara is a high school student who desperately wants to fit in a clique so she would not become lonely. However, because her clique consists of girls who have boyfriends, she has to resort to tell lies about having one herself. To make them more authentic, Erika takes a photo of a random guy in the street. Unfortunately, the guy, Kyoya Sata, turns out to be the most popular boy from her school. Erika asks him to pretend to be her boyfriend, which he agrees to under one condition: that she become his "Wolf Girl" by acting like a pet to him.

To her dismay, Erika discovers that Kyoya is far more dark-hearted than the "princely" personality he feigns towards others; he frequently gives snarks, insults, and generally has a cynical view of the world. Despite this, Erika is slowly attracted and eventually falls in love with him. Kyoya in turn softens and finds out that he is attracted to her as well, something that is cemented when Erika quits being the Wolf Girl after a misunderstanding, which he responds by "promoting" her to become his actual girlfriend.

Erika and Kyoya go through their high school years as a couple while having to face many challenges, including love rivals for each other, misunderstandings, and jealousy. They also learn to understand and change for the benefit of each other. In the process, they befriend three people who form a part of a group: Erika's self-reliant best friend, Ayumi Sanda; Kyoya's hot-blooded best friend, Takeru Hibiya; and the flamboyant Nozomi Kamiya, who becomes their classmate during their second year. Near the end of the series, the couple also have to face the truth of a long-distance relationship when Erika has to move to Kyoto to attend a vocational school for glass making; the two ultimately decide on working it out somehow.

Seven years after graduation, the group have attained each of their preferred professions, with Erika herself becoming a glass maker. She has also married Kyoya, with whom she has a daughter, Yuina.

Characters

 (anime and drama CD) Played by: Kento Yamazaki
The main male protagonist of the series. At the beginning, when Erika suggested her idea of faking lovers, Kyōya agrees to it with a "Prince Charming" attitude. However, shortly after, he blackmails, torments and makes her his "dog". Gradually, he starts to genuinely care for her and becomes jealous whenever she gets close to other guys. He also develops a protective attitude towards her. As the series continues, the story shifts focus from Erika to him, as he realizes his actual feelings for her and that she is not just a way to "pass time". He is actually more of tsundere hiding under the disguise of a sadist. Once Kyōya learns that he could lose Erika to Yū, he goes after her during their date and confesses his feelings for her. Kyōya also has an older sister who more or less shares his sadistic tendencies, and a fun-loving, rather hare-brained mother.

 (anime and drama CD) Played by: Fumi Nikaidō
The main female protagonist of the series. Erika often tells tall tales about her having a boyfriend and takes a photo of a random guy to show as proof. However, the guy turns out to be Kyoya Sata, who also goes to her school. After some pleading, he agrees to pretend to be her boyfriend under the condition that she become his "pet dog." She eventually falls for him, despite his cruel attitude towards her and desperately tries to win his affection.

 (anime and drama CD) Played by: Mugi Kadowaki
Known also as San-chan, Sanda is a short-haired girl and initially the only one of Erika's friends to know the "fake boyfriend" situation. She is the complete opposite of Erika, being mature, self-reliant, and quiet. She is also the classmate of Kyouya during their first year. Though Sanda had a short interest in Kyoya, she considers her friendship with Erika to be more important than her crush. Later into the series, she also becomes close to Takeru.
In the film adaptation, Sanda studies in a separate, all-girls, school from Erika, making her a stranger to Kyoya.

 (anime and drama CD) Played by: Ryusei Yokohama
Kyōya's best friend from middle school who is inheriting his family's cafe business. He is a hot blooded man with a simple and clear personality. He fully supports Erika and Kyoya's relationship, being relieved that Kyoya is finally able to befriend someone other than himself. Later into the series, Takeru becomes close to Sanda, which initially causes Nozomi's jealousy, as he thinks that their and Erika and Kyoya's relationships will make him the only single in their group.

 (anime and drama CD) Played by: Tina Tamashiro
One of Erika's friends.

 (anime and drama CD) Played by: Elaiza Ikeda
One of Erika's friends. She is dating Hajime Mukai, who is several years older than her. Late to the series, Mukai makes plans to move to Italy, initially causing both him and Tezuka to decide to end the relationship after the summer ends. However, with Erika and Kyoya's encouragement, Tezuka decides to move with him after her high school graduation despite her parents protests.

 (anime and drama CD) Played by: Nobuyuki Suzuki
Nozomi is a super flashy guy and belongs in the same year as Kyouya and Erika. Also, he is a sort of a playboy type. He can easily remember the names he just acquainted to, especially cute girls name. When he first sees Kyōya, Nozomi believes he is the same as himself, even when he learns that Kyōya and Erika are dating. He tries to get him to come around to his way of thinking; that it is no fun being held down by one girl. However, Kyōya refuses and says how pointless it is to have meaningless flings with various girls, causing Nozomi to give up. He also decided that he should find someone special to him as Erika is to Kyōya. Since then, he becomes a part of their group and even briefly becomes worried that he will be left as the "third wheel" after finding out that Takeru and Ayumi are attracted to each other. 
In the film adaptation, Nozomi's personality is combined with that of Yoshito Kimura, a minor character who wants to date Erika just so he can get his revenge at Kyoya. Because of this, he never befriends Erika nor becoming a part of her group.

 (anime) Played by: Ryo Yoshizawa
An unconfident and shy outcast, deemed a "coward" by Kyōya. Erika becomes friends with him after discovering that under his quiet exterior is an earnest, kind-hearted person. He started to develop feelings for Erika, causing him to dislike the way Kyōya treats Erika. Erika and him go on a date and attempt to become romantically close, but she confesses that she still likes Kyouya. He kindly accepts this and warns Kyouya not to hurt her again. He ends up dating Edano.

 (anime and drama CD)
A boy in Erika's grade. He tries to get Erika to fall in love with him to get revenge on Kyōya for "attracting" his girlfriend, which fails. He seldom makes appearances afterward, where he is revealed to have dated another girl.
In the film adaptation, though Kimura does not appear, his role is combined with that of Kamiya.

Atsuma, nicknamed "Atsu", is Marin's boyfriend. He is cheerful and pixie-like, surprising Erika when she first meets him, as she always thought of him as a "cool guy". Atsu accompanies Marin on a double date with Erika and Kyoya. When thugs bully him and Marin, he chickens out, which disappoints Marin and makes her consider breaking up with him. However, with Kyoya's advice, he stands up against the thugs despite being unprepared, impressing Marin and rejuvenating her love.

 
Kitamura is Erika's bespectacled homeroom teacher from her second year until graduation. He is stern and dislikes the playfulness of Erika's group, though at the end of the series he gets permission for the class to hold a ball before graduation ceremony.

 Played by: Nanao
Reika is Kyōya older sister who lives with their mother, Hitomi, in Kobe after their parents' divorce, where she attends university. She has the same personality as Kyoya does: cynical, derisive, and pessimistic, and the two often go out their way to insult and snark at each other. Having becoming used to seeing girls fawn over her brother due to his handsome looks, she thinks that Kyoya will never find a serious partner, initially making her dismissive of Erika. After seeing how close Kyoya had genuinely become towards Erika, Reika supports her and gets mad whenever Kyoya treats her badly.

Hitomi is Kyoya and Reika's mother. After divorcing her husband, she moved to Kobe, but only took Reika with her. Since then, she has felt guilty for abandoning Kyoya, who is forced to live in a lonely environment as his father is constantly at work. Unlike her children, Hitomi is fun-loving and has a rather child-like personality, though she has a bad streak whenever she drinks alcohol.

Rena is Erika's maternal cousin. She is a senior middle school student during her first appearance. Kyoya tutors her for the high school entrance exam, something that Rena is annoyed at since Kyoya always treats her like a child. When he saves her from a stuffy boyfriend, however, Rena falls in love with him and declares to Erika that she will become her "official rival". Nevertheless, Kyoya's constant dismissal of her, combined with his refusal to leave Erika, causes Rena to drop her pursuit. She is later revealed to have successfully entered the same public school as Erika and Kyoya.

Kasai is a classmate of Erika and Kyoya during their senior high school year. She volunteers for the position of female organizer for the field trip to Hokkaido and has to work together with Kyoya, who is picked as the male organizer. She is no-nonsense and serious about her choice, criticizing Erika when she wants her to give her position to her just so she can be with Kyoya. While she claims to have no interest in Kyoya, she views his relationship with Erika as rather dysfunctional and urges Kyoya to consider breaking up with her. She accepts his refusal to do so, however, and settles her differences with Erika amicably afterwards.

Terasaki is Erika's middle school friend and the only boy to have confessed to her before she met Kyoya. She nicknames him "Terapon" and he in turn calls her "Nikuman". Back then, Terasaki was rather portly, but since Erika's rejection he has worked out to become slimmer. Erika meets Terasaki again during her senior year while looking for a part-time job in a DVD rental, where he also works in. Despite being estranged for over three years, Terasaki still harbors feelings for Erika and stubbornly tells her to break up with Kyoya, whom he deems insensitive and to become his girlfriend instead. He is rather forceful in his flirtation towards her, such as deliberately kissing her when he catches her off-guard. When she once again rejects him, he hits her and is ready to do so again when she firmly states her loyalty to Kyoya. He is only restrained from doing so again by Kyoya, who beats him up and tells him to stay away from Erika. Before the couple leave, Terasaki wishes that their relationship crumble so Erika will know that her choice is wrong.

 and 
Erika's nuclear family consists of a father and mother. Erika's father is an ordinary office worker with a passion for yakuza films, while her mother is a homemaker with the same childish personality as Erika. While they are present in early chapters, they do not play significant roles until late in the series. Erika's father catches Kyoya leaving Erika's room late one evening, who had been looking after her since she was ill and had fallen asleep while doing so, causing Kyoya to make a quick embarrassed leave. After this, he and Erika's mother invite Kyoya for dinner so they can learn more about him. There, Erika's father, who becomes jealous of Kyoya stealing Erika away from him, goes into a tantrum while drinking alcohol and drives him to leave dinner early. Afterwards, however, he properly apologizes to Kyoya and accepts he is a good guy. Later, when Erika has made up her mind to study glass making, her mother briefly becomes infuriated as she thinks that she is not serious. After realizing she is serious about her career choice, she calms down and contacts her sister-in-law, Eiko, to take up Erika under her tutelage.

Murai is Tezuka's adult boyfriend. He often lends his car to take Tezuka and her friends home after school, but is unseen until late to the series, where he goes with Tezuka, Marin, Erika, and Kyoya to a camping trip of their senior year. Tezuka reveals that she is going to break up with Murai because he is about to relocate to Italy, a choice that the two have settled down. However, when Erika and Kyoya advise them not to suddenly part ways, Tezuka decides to follow Murai after graduation.

Eiko
Eiko is Erika's paternal aunt who lives in Kyoto with her husband, Shinichi, and young son, Kei. She works as a glassware maker and once sent a glass as a gift for Erika's family. Erika visits her sometime after the Bon Festival of her third year to see a display she puts up for the festival. Eiko introduces Erika to the world of glass making, which she quickly develops a passion for "like love". Erika later determines glass making as her focus after graduation and is offered to study in Kyoto's vocational school while simultaneously learning under and helping Eiko with her business.

Media

Manga 
Written and illustrated by Ayuko Hatta, Wolf Girl and Black Prince was serialized in Shueisha's Bessatsu Margaret magazine from October 25, 2011, to May 13, 2016. The series' chapters were collected in sixteen tankōbon volumes.

At New York Comic Con 2022, Viz Media announced that they licensed the series for English publication.

Anime 
An anime television series adaptation aired in Japan between October 5, 2014, and December 21, 2014. Produced by Shueisha, Yomiuri Telecasting Corporation, VAP, TYO Animations and Yomiuri-TV Enterprise, the series is directed by Ken'ichi Kasai, with Sawako Hirabayashi handling series composition, Maki Fujioka designing the characters and Gō Sakabe composing the music. It ran for 12 episodes. Crunchyroll streamed the series, while Sentai Filmworks has licensed the series.

Live-action film
A live-action film adaptation directed by Ryūichi Hiroki premiered in Japanese theaters on May 28, 2016. It grossed US$10,639,039 at Japan box office.

Reception
The manga has sold over 2.4 million copies as of April 2014. The 7th volume reached the number four place on the Oricon weekly manga chart in the week of September 23–29, 2013, with 102,872 copies sold.

References

External links
Official anime website 
Ookami Shoujo to Kuro Ouji at Shueisha 

2014 Japanese television series endings
2016 comics endings
Manga adapted into films
School life in anime and manga
Sentai Filmworks
Shueisha franchises
Shueisha manga
Shōjo manga
Tokyo MX original programming
Viz Media manga
Yomiuri Telecasting Corporation original programming
Yumeta Company
Japanese romantic comedy films